Matkins is an unincorporated community in southwest Harrison County, in the U.S. state of Missouri.

The community is at the junction of Missouri routes P and  TT. The site is on a ridge between White Oak Creek to the west and Little Sampson Creek to the east. The community is approximately eight miles southwest of Bethany.

History
A post office called Matkins was established in 1880, and remained in operation until 1907. The community bears the name of an early settler.

References

Unincorporated communities in Harrison County, Missouri
Unincorporated communities in Missouri